Jonathan Kyle Labine (born April 7, 1983) is a Canadian actor. His brothers Tyler Labine and Cameron Labine also work in the entertainment industry.

Filmography

Film

Television

References

External links

1983 births
Living people
Canadian male film actors
Canadian male voice actors
Canadian male television actors
People from Brampton
Male actors from Ontario
20th-century Canadian male actors
21st-century Canadian male actors
Franco-Ontarian people